The Deputy Prime Minister of Spain, Vice President of the Government or First Deputy Prime Minister (when there is more than one deputy prime minister) is the second highest position in the Government of Spain. Between 1840 and 1934 the title was Vice President of the Council of Ministers. Since its creation, there have been twenty-one deputy prime ministers.

List of officeholders
Office name:
Vice Presidency of the Council of Ministers (1840–1841; 1925–1931; 1933–1934)
Vice Presidency of the Government (1938–1939; 1962–1973; 1982–1995; 2011–2020)
First Vice Presidency of the Government (1974–1975; 1976; 1977–1981; 1981–1982; 1996–2011; 2020–present)
Vice Presidency of the Government for Defence Affairs (1975–1976)
First Vice Presidency of the Government for Defence Affairs (1976–1977)
Vice Presidency of the Government for Economic Affairs (1982; 2011)

References

See also
Deputy Prime Minister of Spain
Prime Minister of Spain
List of Spanish monarchs
List of heads of state of Spain
President of the Republic (Spain)
List of Spanish regents

Government of Spain
Politics of Spain
Deputy Prime Ministers
Spain
 
Lists of political office-holders in Spain